Endurium may refer to:

Endurium, a fictional crystalline element originally invented for the 1986 science fiction video game Starflight
"Endurium", the last track on the 2001 Biosphere double album Substrata 2